Tibilaani is a settlement in the Khetagurovo Community, Tskhinvali District of South Ossetia, a region of Georgia whose sovereignty is disputed.

Geography 
Located on Shida Kartli plain.   900  meters above sea level.

See also
 Tskhinvali District

Notes

References  

Populated places in Tskhinvali District